In algebraic geometry, given a line bundle L on a smooth variety X, the bundle of n-th order principal parts of L is a vector bundle of rank  that, roughly, parametrizes n-th order Taylor expansions of sections of L.

Then the bundle of n-th order principal parts is

Then  and there is a natural exact sequence of vector bundles

where  is the sheaf of differential one-forms on X.

See also 
Linear system of divisors (bundles of principal parts can be used to study the oscillating behaviors of a linear system.)
Jet (mathematics) (a closely related notion)

References 

Appendix II of Exp II of 

Algebraic geometry